South Carolina Highway 385 (SC 385) is a  primary state highway in the U.S. state of South Carolina. It connects the city of Bennettsville with northern Marlboro County.

Route description
SC 385 is a two-lane (mostly) rural highway, traverses  from Bennettsville north to SC 79, near the North Carolina state line.

History

The first SC 385 appeared around 1941-42 as a new primary route from SC 341 to U.S. Route 15 (US 15)/SC 34. In 1948, it was downgraded to a secondary road.

The current SC 385 was established between 1968-70 as a renumbering of SC 79 from US 15 Business (US 15 Bus.)/US 401 Bus. in Bennettsville to current SC 79. Around 1990, it was extended south, replacing US 15 Bus./US 401 Bus. through downtown Bennettsville to its current terminus at US 15/US 401.

Junction list

Bennettsville connector route

South Carolina Highway 385 Connector (SC 385 Conn.) is a connector route that is nearly entirely within the eastern portion of Bennettsville. It follows East Main Street and Tyson Avenue and is an unsigned highway.

It begins at an intersection with the SC 385 mainline (known as North Cook Street north of here and also known as East Main Street west of here). It travels to the east-northeast on East Main Street, through a residential area of the city. At the northern terminus of Tyson Avenue, it turns right and travels to the south-southeast. Just before an intersection with Fayetteville Avenue, the highway begins to curve to the southeast. It crosses over two different railroad lines of Pee Dee River Railway. At the second set of railroad tracks, it leaves the city limits. A short distance later, it reaches its eastern terminus, an intersection with US 15/US 401/SC 9.

See also

References

External links

SC 385 at Virginia Highways' South Carolina Highways Annex

385
Transportation in Marlboro County, South Carolina